Everett Charles Little (June 12, 1954 – December 12, 2022) in Fort Worth, Texas) is a former National Football League offensive guard who played for the Tampa Bay Buccaneers in 1976. He attended Lufkin High School and then the University of Houston before being taken by the Buccaneers in the 4th round, 124th overall, in the 1976 NFL Draft.

References

Living people
1954 births
Tampa Bay Buccaneers players
People from Lufkin, Texas
Players of American football from Texas
American football offensive guards
Houston Cougars football players